The de Havilland T.K.1 was a 1930s British two-seat biplane and the first design built by students of the de Havilland Technical School.

Design and development
The T.K.1 was built by students under the direction of Marcus Langley at Stag Lane Aerodrome in 1934, based on converting the de Havilland Swallow Moth monoplane to a biplane. It was a conventional two-seat biplane powered by a  de Havilland Gipsy III and first flown in June 1934. It was flown by Geoffrey de Havilland to 5th place in the 1934 King's Cup air race with a speed of 124.4 mph. It was sold onto a private owner in 1936 who flew it for as short time as a single-seater before it was scrapped.

Specifications

Notes

References

1930s British civil utility aircraft
T.K.1
Biplanes
Single-engined tractor aircraft
Aircraft first flown in 1934